The 2019 Super DIRTcar Series is the 46th season of Big Block Modified racing sanctioned by DIRTcar Northeast & World Racing Group. The season will begin with the DIRTcar Nationals at Volusia Speedway Park on February 12 (featuring 5 non-points races) while the first points scoring race of the season will be the Highbank Holdup at Can-Am Speedway on April 13 The season will end with the Can-Am World of Outlaws World Finals at The Dirt Track at Charlotte on November 9. Matt Sheppard enters the 2019 season as the defending series champion.

The 2019 season will continue to feature qualifier races for NAPA Auto Parts Super DIRT Week. Any qualifier race winner will have a guaranteed provisional starting spot in the 200 lap event at Oswego Speedway on October 13.

Team & Driver Chart

Driver & Team Changes 
 - HBR Racing (Max McLaughlin & Jimmy Phelps) will chase the Super DIRTcar Series championship once again in 2019. Max will compete part time due to his full time Nascae K&N Pro Series Ride.
 - Peter Britten has left Graham Racing to chase the points championship in the Super DIRTcar Series alone.
 - Billy Decker will return to Gypsum Racing for the 2019 season starting at the points season opener at Can Am.
 - Stewart Friesen and the Halmar Friesen Racing team will only run in select races that don't conflict with Friesen's NASCAR Camping World Truck Series schedule.
 - Tim McCreadie will only run in select races that don't conflict with McCreadie's dirt late model schedule this year he will only run the unsanctioned Eastern States 200 at Orange County Fair Speedway.
 - Mat Williamson has teamed up with Buzz Chew Racing to bring home the 2019 Super Dirtcar Series title driving the Buzzchew Chevy number 88 machine

Schedule
FloRacing will broadcast 20 nights of racing with live video online (12 regular season races, Super DIRT Week & the BBM portion of World Finals). DIRTvision.com will broadcast all races with live radio coverage, and will have live video for the Volusia races. MavTV will broadcast select races (Volusia, Weedsport, Oswego + others) on tape delay, in partnership with Speed Sport.

 - ≠ will state if the race was postponed or canceled
 - ≈ will state if the race is not for championship points

Schedule notes and changes
 - the races at Eldora Speedway, and Sharon Speedway won't return in 2018 as Eldora has selected a new division to support the NASCAR Camping World Truck Series event.
 - night #1 of DIRTcar Nationals at Volusia Speedway Park (February 13) was canceled due to weather conditions.
 - night #2 of DIRTcar Nationals at Volusia Speedway Park (February 14) was postponed to February 15 due to fog.
 - the Highbank Holdup at Fulton Speedway (April 28) was canceled due to weather conditions.
 - the Battle at the Bridge at Bridgeport Speedway (May 16) was canceled due to weather conditions.
 - SDS series officials announced on June 1 that the series will return to Orange County Fair Speedway for the first time since 2014 on July 19. The race will be called "The Battle on the Midway" and will be a NAPA Auto Parts Super DIRT Week qualifier race. The race will be $10k to win as well.

Results and Standings

Races

See also
 - 2018 World of Outlaws Craftsman Sprint Car Series
 - 2018 World of Outlaws Craftsman Late Model Series

References

2018 in American motorsport
2018 in Canadian motorsport